Henry I of Ziębice (– aft. 8 August 1366), was a titular Duke of Ziębice from 1358 until his death.

He was the second and youngest son of Nicholas the Small, Duke of Ziębice, by his wife Agnes, daughter of Herman Krušina of Lichtenberg.

Life
After his father's early death in 1358, Henry I and his older brother Bolko III succeeded him in the Duchy of Ziębice as co-rulers; however, because they are minor at that time, their mother, the Dowager Duchess Agnes held the regency on their behalf until 1360, when Bolko III assumed the government of the Duchy by himself and take the guardianship of his brother.

In order to avoid further divisions of the already small Duchy of Ziębice, Henry I was destined since his early youth to a Church career. On 17 August 1360 he received from Pope Innocent VI the Canonry of the Chapter of Wroclaw, although is known that he early received the prebendary of the Church of Holy Cross, also in Wroclaw.

According to the "Chronicles of the Polish Dukes", Henry I joined to the Teutonic Order and died in Prussia after he left the Order. The exact date of his death is unknown, although was certainly between 1366 and 1370.

References
 
 
 Genealogical database by Herbert Stoyan
 Genealogy of the Dukes of Ziębice

1350s births
1360s deaths
Piast dynasty